The Early Learning Centre designed by Teeple Architects in 2003 is an intricate space intended for the children of the University of Toronto faculty and students to enhance the enjoyment of their learning experiences.  One of the most important aspects of the building is the large open spaces, big windows, and clear connections between rooms that allow for children's interaction with the exterior environment and with each other.

The building is made up of multi-levels, leaving some areas to be double-height, creating loft and pit-like spaces for the children to play in.  The different rooms are mainly centered on a ramp, which is used for circulation.  There are lightwells that run along the double-atrium ramp that help to brighten up the spaces. The whole building was designed around a large walnut tree, which currently is placed in the back of the building. The exterior of the building is made up of large Gavalume panels, and light green-tinted transparent glass windows.  They seem randomly placed, but in fact follow a certain pattern and the positioning of each panel and glass is properly justified The entire building has a planar profile is very linear, and does not consist of any curvy or irregular shapes. The architects were also careful in creating a structure that did not stand out too much from its surrounding buildings. Though the principal materials are different from the residential building on the site, the architects conveyed some of the material elements of the brick by using it along the main entrance ramp of the centre. In terms of size, the centre though larger than most surrounding buildings, still maintains a modest size and is not overwhelmingly large. Overall, Teeple Architects were quite successful in generating an intricate playful space and rather complex form with the use of simple shapes and ideas.

References

University of Toronto buildings